This is a list of South African television-related events in 2014.

Events
6 April – Mandla Hlatshwayo wins season 3 of Big Brother.
18 August – SABC sacks the 16 cast members of its soap, Generations after the actors went on strike following a long-running dispute over their employment contracts.
6 September – Launch of the South African version of The X Factor.
20 September – The Top Billing presenter Jonathan Boynton-Lee and his partner Hayley Bennett-Fraiden win the seventh season of Strictly Come Dancing.
9 November – 14-year-old singer and guitarist Tholwana Mohale wins the fifth season of SA's Got Talent.
23 November – Vincent Bones wins the tenth season of Idols South Africa.
13 December – Four win the first season of The X Factor South Africa.

Debuts

Domestic
2 February - Big Brother (M-Net) (2001-2002, 2014–present)
6 September - The X Factor South Africa (SABC 1) (2014–present)

International
 Fireman Sam (CGI) (e.tv)
 Angelina Ballerina: The Next Steps (e.tv)
 Dinopaws (CBeebies)
 Wander Over Yonder (Disney XD)

Television shows

1980s
Good Morning South Africa (1985-present)
Carte Blanche (1988–present)

1990s
Top Billing (1992–present)
Generations (1994–present)
Isidingo (1998–present)

2000s
Idols South Africa (2002–present)
Strictly Come Dancing (2006-2008, 2013–2015)
Rhythm City (2007–present)
SA's Got Talent (2009–present)

New channels
30 September - Nicktoons

Ending this year

Births

Deaths

See also
2014 in South Africa

References

 
South African Television, 2014 In